Florian ZaBach (August 15, 1918 – February 25, 2006) was an American musician and TV personality.

His recording of "The Hot Canary" sold a million copies and reached the top 15 on the Pop charts in 1951. "Believe It or Not" timed his violin performance of "The Flight of the Bumblebee" and wrote, "he plays 12.8 notes per second ... faster than any known violinist in history". He hosted a television show in 1954 that was aired in cities around the world.

In 1960, for his work on television, ZaBach was honored with a star on the Hollywood Walk of Fame at 6505 Hollywood Blvd.

Biography
ZaBach was born in Chicago, the only child of Florian ZaBach Sr., who played clarinet with the Vienna Philharmonic, and Anna Morganfort-ZaBach. He studied music and learned to play the violin with his father and at the Chicago Cosmopolitan Conservatory of Music. At the age of 12 he debuted with the Chicago Symphony orchestra playing the Mendelssohn concerto. He went to the Prague Conservatory in Czechoslovakia to further his violin studies.

When he returned to the United States, he joined the music staff of Chicago's NBC and WGN radio stations. After  years in the Army Medical Corps as a private and a corporal, he resumed his musical career in Washington, D.C. at the Mayflower Hotel. Television's Arthur Godfrey discovered him there, and ZaBach appeared on Godfrey's show several times. He also appeared on most of the television shows emanating from New York at the time: Ed Sullivan, Milton Berle, Ken Murray, Red Skelton, Steve Allen, Jack Paar and 25 appearances on The Tonight Show. For over a year he performed five one-hour shows daily, seven days a week as master of ceremonies, orchestra conductor and violin soloist on the stage of Strand Theatre on Broadway.

ZaBach then moved to Hollywood, where he filmed the "Florian ZaBach" show, a weekly half-hour television series that was syndicated nationwide in more than 90 markets and in major cities throughout the world. He also appeared with major symphony orchestras as soloist and conductor on their pops concerts in the United States and in London, Vienna, Genoa, Venice, Australia and Beijing, among other concert halls.

ZaBach recorded many albums for Mercury and Decca using his 1732 Guarnerius del Gesu violin, created in Cremona, Italy. including million-seller "The Hot Canary" on Decca in 1951 and a minor hit "When The White Lilacs Bloom Again' on Mercury in 1956.

ZaBach spent the later years of his life living and working in Clarks Summit, Pennsylvania. His compositions and musical arrangements were donated to the Florian ZaBach Papers in the Library of Congress in August 2005. He died at Scranton, Pennsylvania on February 25, 2006.

Discography
A partial listing of his recordings follows.

Vinyl LPs

Golden Strings
Hi-Fi Fiddle
The Hot Canary  (1951)
Hour of Love
String Along With ZaBach
Till the End of Time (m) (1958)
It's Easy to Dance With Florian ZaBach (m) (1959)   
Do It Yourself Wedding Album (June Valli & Florian ZaBach) (1959)
With the Nashville Country Strings
Till the End of Time (s) (1959)
It's Easy to Dance With Florian ZaBach (s) (1960)

Vinyl 45s

"April in Portugal"
"Dream of Romance"
"Fiddler's Boogie"
"Jalousie"
"Oceans of Love"
"Petticoats of Portugal"
"Pussy Footin'"
"Runaway Romance"
"Rainbow Trail"
"Red Canary" 
"Red Wing"
"Running off the Rails"
"Tea for Two"
"Waltzing Cat"
"When the White Lilacs Bloom Again" (1956)
"Whistler and His Dog"

Vinyl 78s

Red Canary/April in Portugal
Fiddler's Boogie

References and notes

External links

Melbourne Observer - Wednesday, December 7, 2005 Melbourne Australia
Music You (Possibly) Won't Hear Anyplace Else
Local 802 News Obituaries, October 2006

American classical violinists
Male classical violinists
American male violinists
American television personalities
Musicians from Chicago
People from Lackawanna County, Pennsylvania
1918 births
2006 deaths
Cadence Records artists
20th-century classical violinists
Classical musicians from Illinois
20th-century American male musicians
United States Army personnel of World War II
United States Army soldiers
20th-century American violinists